Äpäre (Translation from Finnish to English: Don't Worry) is the fourth studio album by the Finnish dark metal band Ajattara. It was released in 2006 on Spikefarm Records.

Track listing

Personnel

Ajattara
 Ruoja – vocals, and rhythm guitar
 Samuel Lempo – lead guitar
 Atoni (Toni Laroma) – bass guitar
 Irstas (Kalle Sundström)  – keyboards
 Malakias III (Atte Sarkima) – drums

Additional personnel and staff
 Tomi Laurén – cover art
 Mika Jussila – mastering

External links
 Äpäre at Allmusic

2006 albums
Ajattara albums